Melpomene brevipes is an extremely rare and possibly extinct species of fern in the family Polypodiaceae. It is endemic to Ecuador.  Its natural habitat is subtropical or tropical moist montane forests. It is threatened by habitat loss. It is estimated that there are less than 5 ferns, if they are still existing

References

Polypodiaceae
Endemic flora of Ecuador
Ferns of Ecuador
Ferns of the Americas
Critically endangered flora of South America
Taxonomy articles created by Polbot